The School of Architecture is an architecture school in Liverpool, England, and part of the University of Liverpool. It was the first architecture school in the United Kingdom to be affiliated with a university, and the first to have degree programmes validated by the Royal Institute of British Architects (RIBA), in 1895. Six RIBA Gold Medallists have been staff or graduates of Liverpool. The School was initially an important centre for the Arts and Crafts movement, but later promoted Classical and Modernist ideas under the influence of Charles Herbert Reilly.

Notable alumni and academic staff
 Robert Anning Bell
Patrick Abercrombie
 Lionel Bailey Budden
 Dariush Borbor, Iranian architect, urban planner, civic designer, writer
 Maxwell Fry
 William Holford, Baron Holford
 Quentin Hughes
 Augustus John
 Stirrat Johnson-Marshall
 Thomas Alwyn Lloyd
 Charles Herbert Reilly
 Colin Rowe
 Herbert James Rowse
 Giles Gilbert Scott
 James Stirling
 F. X. Velarde

See also
 University of Liverpool School of Medicine
 University of Liverpool School of Veterinary Science
 Liverpool Knowledge Quarter
 Xi'an Jiaotong-Liverpool University Architecture Department

References

External links 
 Liverpool School of Architecture 
RIBA Report 2014

 
Educational institutions established in 1894
1894 establishments in England
Architecture schools in England